JUICE is a widely used non-commercial software package for editing and analysing phytosociological data.

It was developed at the Masaryk University in Brno, Czech Republic in 1998, and is fully described in English manual. It makes use of the previously-developed  TURBOVEG  software for entering and storing such data) and it offers a quite powerful tool for vegetation data analysis, including:
creation of synoptic tables
determination of diagnostic species according to their fidelity
calculation of Ellenberg indicator values for relevés, various indices of alpha and beta diversity
classification of relevés using TWINSPAN or cluster analysis
expert system for vegetation classification based on COCKTAIL method etc.

See also
Phytosociology
Phytogeography
Biogeography

External links

Tichy, L. 2002. JUICE, software for vegetation classification.  J. Veg. Sci. 13: 451-453. (Basic scientific article on the program).

Uses in scientific journals
Pyšek P., Jarošík V., Chytrý M., Kropáč Z., Tichý L. & Wild J. 2005. Alien plants in temperate weed communities: prehistoric and recent invaders occupy different habitats. Ecology 86: 772–785.
 Ewald, J A critique for phytosociology Journal of Vegetation Science (April 2003) 14(2)291-296

Science software
Botany
Biogeography
Ecological data